Serafimovich may refer to:
Serafimovich (town), a town in Serafimovichsky District of Volgograd Oblast, Russia
Alexander Serafimovich (1863–1949), Russian/Soviet writer